Federico Luis Querín (born 10 September 1966) is an Argentine rower. He competed in the men's lightweight coxless four event at the 1996 Summer Olympics.

References

1966 births
Living people
Argentine male rowers
Olympic rowers of Argentina
Rowers at the 1996 Summer Olympics
Place of birth missing (living people)
Pan American Games medalists in rowing
Pan American Games silver medalists for Argentina
Rowers at the 1987 Pan American Games
Rowers at the 1991 Pan American Games